The 2020 Southern Jaguars football team represented Southern University in the 2020–21 NCAA Division I FCS football season. The Jaguars were led by eighth-year head coach Dawson Odums and played their home games at Ace W. Mumford Stadium in Baton Rouge, Louisiana as members of the West Division of the Southwestern Athletic Conference (SWAC).

On July 20, 2020, the Southwestern Athletic Conference announced that it would not play fall sports due to the COVID-19 pandemic, which included the football program. The conference is formalizing plans to conduct a competitive schedule for football during the 2021 spring semester.

Previous season

The Jaguars finished the 2019 season 8–5, 6–1 in SWAC play to finish in first place in the West Division. They ultimately lost the SWAC Championship Game to Alcorn State 24–39.

Preseason

Recruiting class
Reference:

|}

Preseason polls
The SWAC will release their polls in July 2020.

Preseason all–SWAC teams

Offense

Defense

Schedule
The 2020 schedule originally consisted of 5 home, 3 away, and 3 neutral site games in the regular season. The Tigers will travel to SWAC foes Alabama A&M, Alabama State, and Prairie View A&M. The Tigers will play host to SWAC foes Jackson State, Alcorn State, and Arkansas–Pine Bluff. The Tigers will play two neutral site conference games—the Dallas State Fair Showdown against Texas Southern at the Cotton Bowl in Dallas, TX and the Bayou Classic against Grambling State at the Mercedes-Benz Superdome in New Orleans, LA.

Due to the SWAC's postponement of the 2020 football season to spring 2021, games against Florida A&M, Morehouse, and Tennessee State were canceled.

Southern's revised schedule, released by the conference on August 17, will feature six games; 2 home, 3 away, and 1 at a neutral site.

Schedule Source:

Game summaries

at Alabama State

Arkansas–Pine Bluff

at Texas Southern

at Jackson State

vs. Grambling State

References

Southern
Southern Jaguars football seasons
Southern Jaguars football